Manuel "Gabina" Santiago Mendoza is a Puerto Rican politician and former mayor of Aguada. Santiago is affiliated with the New Progressive Party (PNP) and has served as mayor since 2017.

References

Living people
Mayors of places in Puerto Rico
New Progressive Party (Puerto Rico) politicians
People from Aguada, Puerto Rico
Year of birth missing (living people)